Jean-Noël Tremblay,  (7 June 1926 – 23 January 2020) was a Canadian politician, who made career at both the federal and the provincial levels.

Member of Parliament

Tremblay was elected to the House of Commons of Canada in the 1958 election representing the Quebec riding of Roberval and was a member of the Progressive Conservative Party.  He lost re-election in 1962, when for the first time the Social Credit Party made a significant breakthrough in Quebec.

Provincial politics

He won a seat to the National Assembly of Quebec, representing Chicoutimi, in 1966 and was a member of the Union Nationale.  From 1966 to 1970, Tremblay was the Minister of Cultural Affairs in the cabinets of Daniel Johnson, Sr and Jean-Jacques Bertrand. He was known in this period as a vocal Quebec nationalist.

Tremblay supported Jean-Guy Cardinal over Jean-Jacques Bertrand during the party's leadership convention, held on June 21, 1969.

He was re-elected to the legislature in 1970, but was defeated in 1973.

Personal life

Tremblay was born in June 1926 in Saint-André-du-Lac-Saint-Jean, Quebec. He died in January 2020 at the age of 93 in Quebec, Quebec.

Honors

In 1990, he was made a Member of the Order of Canada.

External links

References

1926 births
2020 deaths
French Quebecers
Members of the House of Commons of Canada from Quebec
Members of the Order of Canada
Progressive Conservative Party of Canada MPs
Union Nationale (Quebec) MNAs